Epifanio "Sandy" Obdulio Guerrero Jiménez (born April 6, 1966 in Santo Domingo, Dominican Republic) is a former minor league baseball infielder, who currently serves as the Milwaukee Brewers minor league hitting coordinator for the 2013 season. Guerrero played for 19 seasons, mostly at second base. He is the son of Epy Guerrero and brother of Mike Guerrero.

Playing career
Guerrero began his professional career in 1984 with the Toronto Blue Jays' Rookie League Gulf Coast Blue Jays. After playing there again in 1985, he was promoted to the Class A Ventura County Gulls in 1986. That same year, he moved to the Milwaukee Brewers organization. He played three seasons at Class A Stockton before advancing to the Double-A El Paso Diablos in 1989. He spent the entire 1990 season at El Paso, and was promoted to the Triple-A Denver Zephyrs in 1991. The majority of his 1992 season was played at Denver, but he also played nine games back in Double-A El Paso.

Guerrero played in Taiwan from 1993 to 1998, where he hit .300 or better on five of the six years there, winning five gold gloves at shortstop, four silver bats, one batting title (.361 avg), was MVP in 1994, and was a five time all-star. Guerrero is fluent in Mandarin.

The final four years of his playing career were spent in the Mexican League. He played for the Mexican League's Piratas de Campeche in 1999 (.326 avg) and 2000 (.301 avg) and Langosteros de Cancún in 2001 (.288 avg). Guerreo played parts of 2001 and 2002 with the Adirondack Lumberjacks of the independent Northern League. In 2002, his final professional season, he played for the Mexican League's Olmecas de Tabasco.

Coaching career
After retiring from playing, Guerrero became involved with coaching in the minor leagues. He served as hitting coach for the Huntsville Stars, the Double-A affiliate of the Milwaukee Brewers, from 2003 to 2008, from 2009 to 2011 as the Triple-A Nashville sounds Hitting Coach. 2012 and 2013 as the Milwaukee Brewers minor league hitting coordinator.  Following the completion of the 2010 Pacific Coast League season, Guerrero was added to the Milwaukee Brewers roster as an additional coach for the remainder of the season.

Guerrero was the batting practice pitcher for Prince Fielder and Corey Hart in the Home Run Derby in 2009 and 2010, respectively.  He also pitched to Prince again in 2011 along with Brewers teammate Rickie Weeks. Most recently he pitched to Prince again as the BP pitcher in the 2012 All-Star Game at Kauffman Stadium
Guerrero and Fielder have won the Home Run Derby twice in 2009 & 2012. Guerrero has been invited the last 4 years to the Major League All-Star Game. In 2015, Sandy pitched once again to Prince Fielder in the 2015 MLB All Star Home Run Derby.

References

External links

CPBL
Epy Guerrero at SABR (Baseball BioProject)

1966 births
Living people
Adirondack Lumberjacks players
Brother Elephants players
Dominican Republic baseball players
Dominican Republic expatriate baseball players in Mexico
Dominican Republic expatriate baseball players in Taiwan
Dominican Republic expatriate baseball players in the United States
El Paso Diablos players
Denver Zephyrs players
Gulf Coast Blue Jays players
Langosteros de Cancún players
Mexican League baseball infielders
Mexican League baseball outfielders
Olmecas de Tabasco players
Piratas de Campeche players
Sportspeople from Santo Domingo
Stockton Ports players
Taipei Gida players
Ventura County Gulls players